Robert Muggah is a political scientist, urbanist and security expert. He is the co-founder of the Igarapé Institute and The SecDev Group, where he is known for his work on urbanization, crime prevention, arms control, migration, cyber-security, the digital economy, conflict and development studies. He regularly advises national and city governments, management consultancy and technology firms, United Nations agencies and the World Bank.  

His work on designing interactive platforms to map arms transfers, track homicide, predict crime, and promote police accountability is globally recognized. He was listed as one of the top 100 most important people in violence prevention and is the recipient of numerous honors, including the Lewis Perinbam Award for outstanding humanitarian service and the Lind Fellowship in 2018. One of his organization's, the Igarapé Institute, was ranked the world's top social policy think tank in 2019 by Prospect Magazine.

Career
Before co-founding the Igarapé Institute and SecDev Group, Muggah worked with the Small Arms Survey from its inception in 1999 where he was research director between 2008 and 2011. Over the past decades he has advised the United Nations Development Program, the United Nations Department for Peacekeeping Operations, the United Nations High Commissioner for Refugees, the Inter-American Development Bank, the Latin American Development Bank, and the World Bank in more than 25 countries. He has also consulted with Facebook, Google, McKinsey's and Co, Uber and other companies.  

He is the co-chair of the advisory committee of the Global Parliament of Mayors and the Know Violence in Childhood Network He was nominated by the UN Secretary General to advise a panel on Youth, Peace and Security and is a fellow with the Global Initiative Against Transnational Organized Crime, the Chicago Council on Global Affairs, the Canadian Global Affairs Institute,  and the Global Council for the Future of Cities and Urbanization and the Global Risk Report of the World Economic Forum. He sits on the boards of several technology start-ups.

Muggah has conducted extensive field research on armed violence, public security, fragile cities, population resettlement and climate action. His work on disarmament, demobilization and reintegration, urban warfare as well as stabilization operations in Latin America, Africa and Asia is widely cited. He has conducted multiple household surveys and studies on refugee militarization across Sub-Saharan Africa, the unintended consequences of relocating populations in Latin America and South Asia, the outcomes of community development and violence prevention programs, the future of peacekeeping missions, the implications of rapid urbanization, and the rise of cyber cartels and digital gangs.

He graduated with a BA Honors from University of King's College and Dalhousie University in 1997. He received an MPhil from the Institute for Development Studies at the University of Sussex in 1999. In 2008 earned a Doctorate of Philosophy (DPhil) from the University of Oxford where he was recipient of a grant from the Social Science Research Council. He has taught courses at the Graduate Institute of International and Development Studies in Geneva, at the University of San Diego, the University of British Columbia, and the International Relations Department of the Pontifical Catholic University of Rio de Janeiro. He is non-resident faculty at Princeton University, Singularity University in California and lectures at universities across North America, Latin America, Western Europe and the Middle East and Africa.

Personal life
Muggah is married to Ilona Szabó de Carvalho, co-founder of Instituto Igarapé.

Publications, interviews, and lectures 

Muggah is the author or editor of eight books. The most recent, Terra Incognita: 100 Maps to Survive the Next 100 Years, is co-authored with Ian Goldin and published by Penguin/Random House. Two others, Relocation Failures in Sri Lanka and Refugee Militarization in Africa are focused on migration and resettlement. Two more, Stabilization Operations, Security and Development and Security and Post-Conflict Reconstruction are concerned with UN peace operations and international stability missions. The others, including the Global Burden of Armed Violence and  Open Empowerment, are focused on real and virtual insecurity.

Muggah's research is widely reported in global media outlets. His research on organized crime, the future of cities, climate resilience and the impacts of COVID-19 has been featured by The Atlantic, BBC, CBC, CNN, CBS, The Globe and Mail, Fast Company, Financial Times, Foreign Affairs, Foreign Policy, Globo News, Le Monde, Newsweek, The New York Times, and Wired Magazine, among others. He delivered talks on the future of cities in TED in 2019, 2017 and 2015,  the World Governance Summit in 2018 and at the World Economic Forum Summit in Davos in 2016, 2017 and 2019. He has also spoken on new technologies at the Web Summit in 2014, on smart policing with Google in 2013 and on arms trafficking in 2012.

See also 
Igarapé Institute

References

Alumni of the University of Oxford
People from Toronto
1974 births
Living people
Canadian political scientists